Pentacarbonylhydridorhenium is a chemical compound with the formula ReH(CO)5. This colorless liquid is a weak acid and represents one of the most important derivatives of dirhenium decacarbonyl (Re2(CO)10). It is synthesized by treating a methanolic solution of bromopentacarbonylrhenium(I) (Re(CO)5Br) with zinc and acetic acid (HOAc).

 Re(CO)5Br + Zn + HOAc  →   ReH(CO)5  +  ZnBrOAc

It is moderately sensitive to light: samples turn yellow due to the formation of the metal cluster Re3H(CO)14
 3 Re(CO)5H  →  Re3H(CO)14 + H2 + CO

At 100 °C, it decomposes to Re2(CO)10:
 2 Re(CO)5H → H2 + Re2(CO)10

References

Carbonyl complexes
Organorhenium compounds
Metal hydrides